The Crooked Way is a 1949 American film noir crime film directed by Robert Florey and starring John Payne, Sonny Tufts and Ellen Drew. The film, with a similar plot (a war hero loses his memory stateside) to another film noir Somewhere in the Night, was shot by cameraman John Alton.

Plot
After sustaining a head wound in combat, decorated World War II veteran Eddie Rice (John Payne) is treated at a San Francisco military hospital for a permanent form of amnesia. This leaves him with no knowledge of his life, family and friends prior to his enlistment, a void that the army intelligence unit was unable to fill as they couldn't find any information about him, other than the fact he enlisted in Los Angeles. Doctors tell him that no medical cure exists for his case, but that if he returns to Los Angeles he might run into people who know him and could help him fill in the blanks.
Rice follows this advice and he promptly runs into people who recognize him. However, he is recognized not as Eddie Rice, but as Eddie Riccardi, a dangerous gangster gone missing, whose past behavior generates mistrust among the police and all those who knew him in the past. Furthermore, ruthless crime boss Vince Alexander (Sonny Tufts), who was betrayed by Eddie before he left the town, is now out for revenge.

Cast
 John Payne as Eddie Rice/Eddie Riccardi
 Sonny Tufts as Vince Alexander
 Ellen Drew as Nina Martin
 Rhys Williams as Lieutenant Joe Williams
 Percy Helton as Petey
 John Doucette as Sgt. Barrett
 Charles Evans as Captain Anderson (as Charlie Evans)
 Greta Granstedt as Hazel Downs
 Raymond Largay as Arthur Stacey, M.D.
 Harry Bronson as Danny
 Hal Baylor as Coke (as Hal Fieberling)
 Don Haggerty as Hood
 Jack Overman as Hood
 Crane Whitley as Doctor Kemble/Off-Screen Narrator
 John Harmon as Kelly
 Garry Owen as Man from Green Acres Mortuary

Reception
When the film was released the film critic for The New York Times wrote, "The Crooked Way races along as a melodrama should and it has more than enough plot to keep its hard-working actors going from one dangerous situation to another. But there is so much pointless brutality in it that one may seriously question whether the movie people are wise to go on with the making of such pictures. The human family may not be perfect, but why subject it to so-called entertainment that is only fit for savage beasts."  In the book 100 Film Noirs, Jim Hillier compares and contrasts the film to Somewhere in the Night.  Hillier says that The Crooked Way benefited from its low budget by forcing the filmmakers to be more creative, which makes it the better film.

References

External links
 
 
 
 
 The Crooked Way informational site and DVD review at DVD Beaver (includes images)
 

1949 films
1949 crime drama films
American crime drama films
1940s English-language films
American black-and-white films
Film noir
Films about amnesia
United Artists films
Films directed by Robert Florey
1940s American films